Roland Eradze (born 7 May 1971) is an Icelandic handball player who competed in the 2004 Summer Olympics. .

References

1971 births
Living people
Roland Eradze
Roland Eradze
Handball players at the 2004 Summer Olympics